Sabatia quadrangula, the fourangle rose gentian or four-angle rose-gentian, is a flowering plant native to the eastern United States. It is found in pine savannas, flatwoods, shrub bog borders, ditches, and granite outcrops from Virginia south to the Florida panhandle and west to Alabama.

References

quadrangula
Flora of the United States
Plants described in 1937